Beaverlodge Airport  is located  south of Beaverlodge, Alberta, Canada. It is home to the North Peace Bracket Racing Association.

See also
 Beaverlodge/Clanachan Aerodrome

References

External links
 Page about this airport on COPA's Places to Fly airport directory
 Grande Prairie Soaring Society

Registered aerodromes in Alberta
County of Grande Prairie No. 1